Developmental pluripotency-associated protein 3 is a protein that in humans is encoded by the DPPA3 gene.

This gene encodes a protein that in mice may function as a maternal factor during the preimplantation stage of development. In mice, this gene may play a role in transcriptional repression, cell division, and maintenance of cell pluripotentiality. In humans, related intronless loci are located on chromosomes 14 and X.

References

Further reading